The following is a list of the television networks and announcers who have broadcast college football's Pinstripe Bowl throughout the years.

Television

Radio

References

Broadcasters
Pinstripe Bowl
Pinstripe Bowl
Pinstripe Bowl